Olacaceae is a family of flowering plants in the order Santalales. They are woody plants, native throughout the tropical regions of the world. , the circumscription of the family varies; some sources maintain a broad family, others split it into seven segregate families.

Taxonomy
The 1998 APG system and the 2003 APG II system assign it to the order Santalales in the clade core eudicots. Prior to the advent of molecular data, the circumscription of the family Olacaceae varied widely between different authorities. Among these various classifications, about 30 genera were included in the family. 15 genera are recognized for Olacaceae by the Germplasm Resources Information Network. The phylogenetic investigation published in 2008 recovered seven clades that were well-supported by molecular and morphological characters, but no formal taxonomic reorganization of the family was proposed. For this reason, Olacaceae in the broad sense was adopted by the APG III-system. The formal reconfiguration of this family (as well as the rest of the order Santalales) was published by Nickrent and co-workers in 2010 and this concept is shown below. Olacaceae in the broad sense was split into seven families, and the genus Schoepfia was placed with Arjona and Quinchamalium (both previously Santalaceae) in the family Schoepfiaceae.

Genera
Olacaceae sensu stricto
Dulacia - 13 species of South America
Olax - ca 40 species of the Old World tropics
Ptychopetalum - 2 species of tropical South America and 2 species of western and central Africa

Aptandraceae
Anacolosa - 16 species of the Old World tropics
Aptandra - 3 species in tropical America and 1 species in Africa
Cathedra - 5 species of South America
Chaunochiton - 3 species of tropical America
Harmandia - one species in southeastern Asia
Hondurodendron - one species in Honduras
Ongokea - one species in Africa
Phanerodiscus - 3 species of Madagascar

Ximeniaceae
Curupira - one species in Amazonian Brazil
Douradoa - one species in Brazil
Malania - one species in China
Ximenia - 10 species of the Old and New World tropics

Coulaceae
Coula - one species in tropical western Africa
Minquartia - one species in tropical America
Ochanostachys - one species in western Malaysia

Strombosiaceae
Diogoa - 2 species of tropical Africa
Engomegoma - one species of tropical Africa
Scorodocarpus - one species in tropical Asia
Strombosia - 3 species of tropical Asia and 6 species of tropical Africa
Strombosiopsis - 3 species of tropical Africa
Tetrastylidium - 2 species of South America

Erythropalaceae

Erythropalum - one species of Indomalaysia
Heisteria - ca 33 species of tropical America and 3 species in Africa
Maburea - one species in Guyana

Octoknemaceae
Octoknema - 14 species of tropical Africa

Unplaced genus
Brachynema - morphological cladistic analysis places this genus in Ericales, and no genetic study has yet been published

References

External links
Parasitic Plant Connection: Aptandraceae
Parasitic Plant Connection: Coulaceae
Parasitic Plant Connection: Erythropalaceae
Parasitic Plant Connection: Octoknemaceae
Parasitic Plant Connection: Olacaceae
Parasitic Plant Connection: Strombosiaceae
Parasitic Plant Connection: Ximeniaceae

 
Eudicot families